The New Zealand Society of Translators and Interpreters (NZSTI) (or, in Māori, Te Ropu Kaiwhakamaori a-waha, a-tuhi o Aotearoa) is the professional association for translators and interpreters in New Zealand. Its mission statement:

"NZSTI is a nationally representative body of translators and interpreters that provides a networking forum for its members, represents members' interests, and promotes continued professional development, quality standards and awareness of the profession within government agencies and the wider community.".
 
NZSTI is affiliated with the International Federation of Translators (FIT) and has a close relationship with SLIANZ, the Sign Language Interpreters Association of New Zealand (which has its own seat on the NZSTI National Council).

History 
NZSTI was established in 1985 and has three regional branches in the three main centres of New Zealand: Auckland, Wellington and Christchurch. As well as an annual conference (to be held in Wellington in 2009), the branches hold regular activities through the year to support local members.

Membership 
NZSTI has seven categories of membership: "member" (or "ordinary member"), "affiliate", "observer", "fellow", "retired member", "honorary member" and "foreign member". An online directory is available with a search function by name, by language combinations and by mode (whether a translator or interpreter).

References

External links 
NZSTI website

Translation associations of New Zealand